The Port of Bilbao is located on the Bilbao Abra bay, and along the Estuary of Bilbao, in Biscay (Basque Country). The main facilities are in the Santurtzi and Zierbena municipalities, approximately 15 km (9.3 mi) west of Bilbao. Also called Exterior Port and Superpuerto, the port complex occupies 3.13 km² (773 acres) of land and 16.94 km² (4,186 acres) of water along 17 km (10.6 mi) of waterfront.

History
The history of the port is inseparably linked to the history of Bilbao itself, so the date of its foundation is also that of the city's foundation.

In 1300 Bilbao was granted the status of city and was given control of the maritime traffic entering its estuary. The first docks were built at Bilbao's old town, 15 km (9.3 mi) upstream from the open sea. These docks were the center of the port's activity for more than five centuries.

In 1511 the Consulate of Bilbao privilege was granted, which allowed the port control over the northern European wool export routes.

During the 19th century extensive iron ore deposites were discovered in the nearby hills, which boosted the area's industrial base. The estuary of Bilbao was covered by steel and shipbuilding industries and the docks expanded from Bilbao to the bay. All activity relied on the navigability of the river so engineer Evaristo Churruca developed an enormous project that would solve the traditional navigation problems of the river:
dangerous sand banks that frequently altered the stream's course;
several complicated meanders;
extensive marshy area;
storms blowing in from the Bay of Biscay that flooded the river's mouth.

The river banks were drained and docks were built, the river's course was straightened, the external port was enclosed, and the Puente Colgante transporter bridge was built.
By 1900 Bilbao was Spain's biggest port. This allowed the fast development of the region's economy, and shipyards and steel mills covered the riverbanks. During the 1970s the Santurtzi area was developed and the Deusto channel was created.

But things continued to evolve, the industry decayed and docks were abandoned. On top of that, vessels have constantly increased their tonnage and large tankers and freighters could not enter the river anymore and the Santurtzi area became too congested. In 1975 a large project was conceived, known as the Superpuerto. The plan is for all of Abra Bay to eventually be enclosed by docks. The project continues today.

Shipping

The container volume was over half a million TEUs (twenty-foot equivalent units) in year 2007. The Port is the 4th busiest port in Spain after Algeciras, Barcelona and Valencia. It is Spain's largest port.

From 1998 to the present, the port's physical capacity has increased dramatically, which has led to increased traffic.

The port is served by the RENFE railroad, but a new rail connection is needed because the current line is shared by commuter traffic and goes through a densely populated metropolitan area. A high speed connection is being considered, but Spain's current high-speed network does not support freight traffic.

Cruise ships
A new dock was built in Getxo to meet the increasing demand in cruise ship traffic, fed largely by the opening of the Guggenheim Museum Bilbao in 1997, which has brought in many more tourists and put Bilbao on the cruising routes.

Ferries
In September 2010, Brittany Ferries announced that it would take over the Portsmouth-Bilbao route, with the MV Cap Finistère. The service commenced on 27 March 2011, complementing the company's existing Portsmouth/Portsmouth International Port-Santander and Plymouth-Santander routes.

Between May 1993 and September 2010, P&O Ferries provided this service with the Pride of Bilbao.

Between May 2006 and January 2007, Acciona Trasmediterránea operated a service using the MV Fortuny.

Destinations
Portsmouth by Brittany Ferries
Roscoff by Brittany Ferries
 Rosslare by Brittany Ferries

Environment
There has been a lot of concern about the huge enlargement project of the exterior port. Ecologist movements protest because large portions of the bay are being covered by docks and the adjacent hills are being dynamited to get the raw materials used in the construction of the new docks.

Statistics

Annual Cargo: In tons
Liquid: Liquid cargo (in tons) at the port, including petroleum and LNG at Petronor and BBG
Containers: ATM and TMB terminals. Measured in TEUs
Passengers: Passengers transported by the MV Cap Finistère of Brittany Ferries to Portsmouth
Vessels: Vessels that berthed at the port
Cruises: Cruise ships berthed in Getxo. Note that prior to 2006 cruises anchored in Santurtzi.

References

External links
 Official website 
 Puertos del Estado 

Bilbao
Port of Bilbao
Buildings and structures in Bilbao
Estuary of Bilbao